Clipston and Oxendon railway station on the Northampton and Market Harborough railway opened in 1863 as a result of villagers' requests serving the villages of Clipston and Great Oxendon, Northamptonshire, England. It was about 1 mile south-east of the Oxendon and about 3 miles walking distance north-east of Clipston. It was south of Oxendon tunnel. It was part of the London and North Western Railway.

The station lost its passenger service on 4 January 1960. The line was re-opened for limited periods after that and not closed completely until 15 August 1981. The Heritage Northampton & Lamport Railway hopes that it may eventually re-open the route.

References

Disused railway stations in Northamptonshire
Railway stations in Great Britain opened in 1859
Railway stations in Great Britain closed in 1960
Former London and North Western Railway stations